Vancouver Whitecaps FC is a Canadian soccer club in Vancouver, British Columbia. The club was moved up to Major League Soccer (MLS) after the ownership group of Greg Kerfoot, Steve Luczo, Jeff Mallett, and Steve Nash were awarded a franchise to play in Vancouver. Whitecaps FC began playing competitive soccer in the 2011 season, joining the Western Conference of MLS. It plays its home games at BC Place. The current Whitecaps FC is the third soccer team from Vancouver to bear the Whitecaps name. The tradition was started by Vancouver's North American Soccer League team in 1974, and continued by the city's Canadian Soccer League and United Soccer Leagues side, formed in 1986. The current iteration named Whitecaps FC played its first MLS game on March 19, 2011, a 4–2 victory against Toronto FC. French striker Eric Hassli scored the first goal in Whitecaps FC history.

, eight goalkeepers and one hundred-four outfield players have participated in at least one MLS regular season match for Whitecaps FC. American defender Jordan Harvey leads the club in all-time MLS league appearances (178), while Brazilian striker Camilo Sanvezzo leads in all-time MLS league goals (39). Eight goalkeepers and eighty-eight outfield players have participated in at least one Voyageurs Cup or Canadian Championship match. Camilo Sanvezzo and Pedro Morales are the club's all-time leading goal scorers in Voyageurs Cup play, each with four goals. Three goalkeepers and thirty-nine outfield players have participated in at least one MLS Cup Playoffs match. Uruguayan midfielder Nicolás Mezquida is the club leader in playoff goals, with two. Three goalkeepers and forty outfield players have participated in at least one CONCACAF Champions League match. Uruguayan midfielder Cristian Techera is the club leader in continental goals, with five. This list does not include statistics from exhibition matches.

Players

Statistics complete as of January 15, 2020.

See also
All-time Vancouver Whitecaps roster—equivalent list for the club's CSL Division 1 years and US Division 2 years.

References
General

Specific

External links
Vancouver Whitecaps FC All-Time MLS Players

Vancouver Whitecaps FC
 
Association football player non-biographical articles